Michael Milhoan (born December 19, 1957) is an American actor. Best known as Dante Pacino in Something So Right 
(1996-1998).

Early life
Milhoan was born and raised in St. Petersburg, Florida. He studied jazz music in his early days, then was involved in a car accident. This left him unable to follow his jazz aspirations so he targeted his interest to the field of acting.

Career
Milhoan appeared in the series Something So Right and in the television movies The Princess and the Marine and A Loss of Innocence. He had a recurring role on 3rd Rock from the Sun as the gym coach of Tommy Solomon, played by Joseph Gordon-Levitt. His film work includes roles in Tin Cup, Pearl Harbor, Collateral Damage, Anywhere but Here, Crimson Tide, Executive Decision, Phenomenon, and Field of Dreams.

Milhoan, who lives in St. Petersburg, Florida, is the chief executive officer of a full-service production company.

Filmography

References

External links

1957 births
20th-century American male actors
21st-century American male actors
American male film actors
American male television actors
Living people